KCCA may refer to:

 Clinton Municipal Airport (Arkansas) (ICAO code KCCA)
 KCCA-LP, a low-power radio station (92.1 FM) licensed to Anthony, Kansas, United States
 Kampala Capital City Authority, the legal administrative entity responsible for running the day-to-day affairs of Kampala, the capital city of Uganda in East Africa
 Karachi City Cricket Association
 Kampala Capital City Authority FC